Gnaeus Octavius was consul of the Roman Republic in 76 BC. His father Marcus Octavius was possibly either the Marcus who was the tribunus plebis in 133 BC, political opponent of Tiberius Gracchus, or the Marcus who was also tribunus plebis and brought forward a law raising the price at which corn was sold to the people.

A member of the Plebeian gens Octavia, Gnaeus Octavius was elected Praetor by 79 BC at the latest. He may have been the praetor urbanus who introduced the Formula Octaviana, a law which provided for the restoration of property and money which had been obtained by violent acts, or by threats of violence. Gnaeus Octavius was elected consul for 76 BC, with Gaius Scribonius Curio as his colleague.

Scorned as an orator, he was also plagued with attacks of gout, which eventually made it impossible for him to walk.

See also
 Octavia (gens)

References

Sources
 Brennan, T. Corey, The Praetorship in the Roman Republic, Volume 2 (2000)
 Broughton, T. Robert S., The Magistrates of the Roman Republic, Vol. II (1951)
 Smith, William, Dictionary of Greek and Roman Biography and Mythology, Vol III (1867).

1st-century BC Roman consuls
Senators of the Roman Republic
Year of birth unknown
Year of death unknown
Octavii Rufi